Amonate is an unincorporated community and census-designated place (CDP) in Tazewell County, Virginia, United States. Its zip code is 24601. It was first listed as a CDP in the 2020 census with a population of 59.

The community was established in the early 1920s by Faraday Coal & Coke, but became a company town of Pocahontas Fuel in 1923. Its name comes from a nickname for Pocahontas.

References

Unincorporated communities in Tazewell County, Virginia
Unincorporated communities in Virginia
Coal towns in Virginia
Census-designated places in Tazewell County, Virginia
Census-designated places in Virginia